Phospholipid transfer protein is a protein that in humans is encoded by the PLTP gene.

Function 

The protein encoded by this gene is one of at least two lipid transfer proteins found in human plasma. The encoded protein transfers phospholipids from triglyceride-rich lipoproteins to high density lipoprotein (HDL). In addition to regulating the size of HDL particles, this protein may be involved in cholesterol metabolism. At least two transcript variants encoding different isoforms have been found for this gene.

Interactions 

PLTP has been shown to interact with Apolipoprotein A1 and APOA2.

Interactive pathway map

References

Further reading